Bolesław of Cieszyn may refer to:
 Bolesław of Cieszyn (died 1356), Polish prince
 Bolesław I, Duke of Cieszyn (–1431)
 Bolesław II, Duke of Cieszyn (–1452)